Walker County Courthouse may refer to:

Walker County Courthouse (Georgia), LaFayette, Georgia
Walker County Courthouse (Texas), Huntsville, Texas